Saralisa Volm (born June 24, 1985 in Hechingen, West Germany) is a German actress, famous, among other things for her starring role in Finale, a film by . Volm grew up in Freising, where she also went to high school. Part of her schooling was at the Gabriel-von-Seidl-Gymnasium Bad Tölz.

Filmography 

as actress
 2007: Finale (TV movie) 
 2008: Dancing with Devils (TV movie) 
 2009: Dawn (short) 
 2010: Schmutziger Süden (TV movie) 
 2011: Hotel Desire (short)
 2011: SOKO 5113 (TV series) 
Episode: Bis(s) in alle Ewigkeit
 2012: Das ist ja das Leben selbst!
 2012: Berlin für Helden
 2013: Art Girls
 2015: Die Verwandlung
 2015: Simon sagt auf Wiedersehen zu seiner Vorhaut
 2016: Shakespeares letzte Runde
 2017: Mordkommission Istanbul – Ein Dorf unter Verdacht
 2017: Figaros Wölfe
 2017: Fikkefuchs
 2021: Enfant Terrible (Film)
 2021: Als Susan Sontag im Publikum saß

as producer
 2015: Die Verwandlung
 2016: Instrumental Music Musikvideo der Band Leather Report
 2017: Fikkefuchs
 2018: Am Draht der Zeit (Kurzfilm)
 2021: Alone Together (Kunstfilm)
 2021: Ilse (Kurzfilm)
 2021: Schweigend steht der Wald (Spielfilm)

as  director
 2016: Instrumental Music Musikvideo der Band Leather Report
 2018: Am Draht der Zeit (Kurzfilm)
 2022: Schweigend steht der Wald (Spielfilm)

as writer
 2018: Am Draht der Zeit (Kurzfilm)
 2021: Als Susan Sontag im Publikum saß

Awards 
 2009 Norddeutscher Filmpreis als bester Fernsehfilm für Dancing with Devils
 2015 First Steps Award - Nominierung für Die Verwandlung
 2017 Filmfest München - Nominierung für den Förderpreis Neues Deutsches Kino für Fikkefuchs
 2017 Deutscher Filmpreis - Vorauswahl für Fikkefuchs
 2018 Kurzfilmwettbewerb Bayern 2030 – 3. Preis für Am Draht der Zeit
 2021 Hatun Sürüci Preis für bitch MATERial Ausstellungsreihe ( Hatun-Sürücü-Preis 2021 | Grüne Fraktion Berlin (gruene-fraktion.berlin) )

References

External links 

Living people
1985 births
German television actresses
People from Hechingen
German film actresses